Agios Mamas is a village in the Chalkidiki peninsula in northern Greece. It is in the municipal unit of Moudania, within the Municipality of Nea Propontida.

Location

It is located on the gulf of Torone, 3 km from the beach (Papa Aloni), between the two fingers (smaller peninsulas) of Kassandra and Sithonia, 68 km southeast of Thessaloniki and 9 km east of Nea Moudania.

Economy

It is famous for its trade fair in the first days of September commemorating its patron saint Saint Mamas on 2 September.

The inhabitants are involved in olive farming for green table olives and olive oil as the rest of the villages of the area Olynthus, Kalyves Polygyrou and Yerakini.

Its seaside is the continuation of Kalyves Polygyrou's  with a very long sandy beach, after the river Olynthios delta, including Papa Aloni beach  and Portes before Nea Potidea.

References

External links

Populated places in Chalkidiki